Icar Air is a privately owned passenger and cargo charter airline based in Tuzla, Bosnia and Herzegovina.

History
The company was formed in 2000 and operated a Boeing 737. It currently leases aircraft (ACMI), and operates ad hoc charter flights. The company holds a DHL Aviation contract for Bosnia and Herzegovina and operates a scheduled freight service between Sarajevo and Ancona.

Fleet

The Icar Air fleet includes the following aircraft as of February 2023:

 1 Saab 340
 1 Let L-410 Turbolet UVP-E

The airline previously operated the following aircraft:

 1 B737-300
 1 Let L-410 Turbolet

References

Airlines of Bosnia and Herzegovina
Airlines established in 2000
Cargo airlines
2000 establishments in Bosnia and Herzegovina